Elections in Arizona are authorized under the Arizona State Constitution, which establishes elections for the state level officers, cabinet, and legislature.

In a 2020 study, Arizona was ranked as the 21st hardest state for citizens to vote in.

Presidential elections

United States Senate elections 

Before the ratification of the Seventeenth Amendment to the United States Constitution in 1913, United States senators were elected by state legislatures. Arizona's first two Senate elections, which took place in 1912, still featured popular elections, following which the state legislature unanimously elected their respective victories.

Class I (1916 - Present)

Class I (1912)

Class III (1914 - Present)

Class III (1912)

United States House of Representatives elections

Gubernatorial elections 
Governors of Arizona are elected to a term of four years. Prior to a 1968 amendment to the state constitution, governors of Arizona served two-year terms.

1970 - Present

1911 - 1968

See also
 2020 Arizona elections
 Women's suffrage in Arizona

References

External links 
 
 
  (State affiliate of the U.S. League of Women Voters)
 Digital Public Library of America. Assorted materials related to Arizona elections
 

 
Political events in Arizona
Government of Arizona